Markku Laine (born 26 May 1955) is a Finnish middle-distance runner. He competed in the men's 1500 metres at the 1976 Summer Olympics.

References

1955 births
Living people
Athletes (track and field) at the 1976 Summer Olympics
Finnish male middle-distance runners
Olympic athletes of Finland
Place of birth missing (living people)